Liefde Zonder Grenzen is a 2021 Dutch film directed by Appie Boudellah and Aram van de Rest. The film won the Golden Film award after having sold 100,000 tickets.

Jim Bakkum, Yolanthe Cabau and Abbey Hoes are among the cast of the film.

References

External links 
 

2021 films
2020s Dutch-language films
Dutch romantic comedy films
2021 romantic comedy films